Xinjiang Tian Shan Magic Deer is a Chinese professional women's basketball club based in Ürümqi, Xinjiang, playing in the Women's Chinese Basketball Association (WCBA). The team also plays some home games in Changji.

The nickname Tian Shan magic deer is derived from Tian Shan wapiti, an elk subspecies native to Tian Shan in Xinjiang.

Season-by-season records

Current players

Notable former players

 Tina Charles (2015–16)
 Camille Little (2016)
 Candace Parker (2017–18)
 Huang Ping-jen (2017–18)
 Ma Zengyu (2015–16)
 Zhang Xiaoni (2015–16, 2017–18)
 Ma Xueya (2016–17)

References

External links

Women's Chinese Basketball Association teams
Sport in Ürümqi